Wahib al-Ghanim (1919-2003) was a Syrian physician who co-founded the Ba'ath Party. According to Patrick Seale, he, along with Zaki al-Arsuzi, "wanted a stronger dose of socialism than the Damascus leaders" of the Ba'ath Party.

From April 5–7, 1947, Ghanim, along with 247 others, took part in the founding conference of the Ba'ath Party, where he was elected to the executive committee, which also included Michel Aflaq, Salah al-Din Bitar, and Jalal al-Sayyid. In the same year, Ghanim created a Ba'athist cell in Latakia. Hafez al-Assad, the future president of Syria and the father of the current president, was one of the first to join.

During the parliamentary elections of 1947 and 1949, Ghanim unsuccessfully tried to become the deputy for Latakia. He was an opponent of Adib Shishakli, for which he faced persecution. In 1955 - after Shishakhli was deposed of - he joined the cabinet of Sabri al-Asali as health minister. Although Ghanim originally supported the 1958 union with Egypt, by 1961 he had changed his position and supported the coup that ended it.

References

1919 births
2003 deaths
Arab Socialist Ba'ath Party – Syria Region politicians
Members of the National Command of the Ba'ath Party
Syrian Arab nationalists
Syrian socialists